Nar Bahadur Bhandari (5 October 1940 – 16 July 2017) was an Indian politician who served as the chief minister of the state of Sikkim from 1979 to 1994. He was the founding leader of the Sikkim Sangram Parishad. He was popularly remembered for his efforts to include the Nepali language in 8th Schedule of the Constitution of India. He was awarded with prestigious  Jagadamba Shree Purasakar for his contribution for Nepali language. He was the first Indian chief minister of Gorkha origin. He also served as the president of Bharatiya Nepali Bhasha Parisangh until his death. He is popularly known as the architect of modern Sikkim.

Personal life
Nar Bahadur Bhandari was born on 5 October 1940 in Malbasay village, near Soreng, West Sikkim He earned his BA degree from Darjeeling Government College and worked as a school teacher for some years before entering politics. His wife, Dil Kumari Bhandari, is a former member of parliament (Lok Sabha) from Sikkim. He has three daughters and son.

Politics
Bhandari founded the Sikkim Janata Parishad in 1977. This party won the state assembly election in 1979, and he became the chief minister for the first time on 18 October 1979. In 1984, he also served briefly as member of parliament from the Sikkim constituency in the 8th Lok Sabha as an independent candidate. In 1984, Bhandari dissolved Sikkim Janata Parishad and formed a new party called Sikkim Sangram Parishad (SSP). This party ran in the assembly elections in 1985 and won, and Bhandari became the chief minister for the second time. 

In 1989, SSP returned to power by winning the assembly elections. In a rare instance in Indian national politics, the SSP became the singular party in the Sikkim Legislative Assembly, winning all 32 seats in the house.  In 1994, Bhandari lost a vote of confidence in the state assembly, and he resigned as chief minister. Later, he served as a member of the legislative assembly from 1994 to 2004.

In 1994, SSP lost the assembly elections to the Sikkim Democratic Front led by Pawan Kumar Chamling. SSP also lost the 1999 assembly election. In the 2004 state assembly elections, Bhandari ran under the Congress party, but the party lost the election, winning only one seat in the assembly. In May 2007, he was sentenced to prison for one month in a corruption case.  Again in the 2009 assembly elections, the Congress party under Bhandari failed to win any seat in the state assembly. 

In the 2014 election, his party unanimously supported a new political party Sikkim Krantikari Morcha, under the leadership of PS Golay. Bhandari, despite his conviction in a corruption case continued campaigning for SKM which managed to win only 10 seats out of 32. Prior to his death, he was closely involved with the SKM party; he gave his last speech at the SKM Foundation Day Celebration in Singtam on 4 February 2017.

His notable political accomplishments are free education from elementary to graduate school, establishing nearby schools-- within a radius of 3 to 4 km-- for all residents, providing drinking water to every household in Sikkim, building a network of roads to all major villages in Sikkim, bringing all rural areas onto the electric grid, and the setup of vast healthcare centers.

Later life and death
Bhandari became the president of the Sikkim Pradesh Congress Committee (SPCC) after he had merged SSP with the Indian National Congress in 2003. In May 2013, he was reinstated as the president of SSP. In 2014, he was convicted in a CBI corruption case.

Bhandari died on 16 July 2017 following spinal surgery.

His final rites were performed with full state honours by the current chief minister, Pawan Kumar Chamling, including a 21-gun salute. In a very rare gesture, the family of the former king of Sikkim sent their royal flag to be wrapped around Bhandari's body during the state funeral.

Electoral records 
Sikkim Legislative Assembly election

 Lok Sabha election, Sikkim

References

Sikkim politicians
Chief Ministers of Sikkim
Indian Gorkhas
1940 births
2017 deaths
University of North Bengal alumni
People from Gyalshing district
India MPs 1984–1989
Lok Sabha members from Sikkim
Sikkim Sangram Parishad politicians
Sikkim MLAs 1979–1984
Sikkim MLAs 1985–1989
Sikkim MLAs 1989–1994
Sikkim MLAs 1994–1999
Sikkim MLAs 1999–2004
Jagadamba Shree Puraskar winners